Sokov is a Russian masculine surname, its feminine counterpart is Sokova. It may refer to
Ekaterina Sokova (born 2000), Russian artistic gymnast
Leonid Sokov (born 1941), Russian nonconformist artist and sculptor
Mariya Sokova (born 1970), Uzbekistani triple jumper
Vasiliy Sokov (born 1968), Soviet triple jumper, husband of Mariya 

Russian-language surnames